"Ghetto Gospel" is a song by American rapper Tupac Shakur, which was released as the lead single from his 2004 posthumous album Loyal to the Game. The song was produced by American rapper Eminem and features a sample of Elton John's 1971 song "Indian Sunset".

The single topped the charts in the UK (for 3 weeks), Australia, Czech Republic, and Ireland. In New Zealand it peaked at number 3. The song was written by Tupac as an outcry to "end the war on the streets",  addressing the futility of racial difference and dissidence, particularly under the unifying banner of poverty. He also pays tribute to murdered black activists Malcolm X and Bobby Hutton in the song.

In response to Eminem's remix, Elton John said: "how he's managed to meld [Indian Sunset] with Tupac, I'll never know. It's just genius."

Original version
Tupac recorded the song for inclusion on the 1992 Christmas-themed compilation album A Very Special Christmas 2, but due to his legal issues, the song was dropped from the compilation and was never released. This version has a much faster tempo and has a third and fourth verse which didn't feature in the 2004 remix. This version was produced by Big D The Impossible, a regular producer on Tupac's first two albums; 2Pacalypse Now and Strictly 4 My N.I.G.G.A.Z. and does not contain the "Indian Sunset" sample, but builds on a sample of Tracy Chapman's song "Crossroads" instead.

Music video
"Ghetto Gospel" was the only song on Loyal to the Game with an accompanying . The music video showcases the last day of a man's life before he is fatally shot in the evening. Neither 2Pac nor Elton John physically appeared in the video - though clips of 2Pac are shown on a television. Towards the end of the music video, the actor (J. D. Williams) is shot but then appears at his own funeral, fueling rumors that the rapper's death was faked. At the end of the video, there is a message from his mother, Afeni Shakur, saying "Remember to keep yourself alive, there is nothing more important than that".

Track listing
CD single

UK CD single

Official versions
 Ghetto Gospel (Album Version Explicit)

Charts

Weekly charts

Year-end charts

Certifications

Release history

References

External links
 

Elton John songs
2005 singles
2004 songs
Tupac Shakur songs
UK Singles Chart number-one singles
Number-one singles in Australia
Irish Singles Chart number-one singles
Songs released posthumously
Songs with music by Elton John
Songs with lyrics by Bernie Taupin
Song recordings produced by Eminem
Gangsta rap songs
Songs written by Tupac Shakur
Gospel songs